Adamanasuchus is an extinct genus of aetosaur. Fossils have been found from several localities from the Chinle Group in Arizona and date back to the late Carnian stage of the Late Triassic. The locality from which it was named after also lends its name to the Adamanian LVF (land vertebrate faunachron).

References

Fossil taxa described in 2007
Aetosaurs of North America
Prehistoric pseudosuchian genera